Sacred Heart Cathedral in Salina, Kansas, United States is the cathedral and a parish church in the Catholic Diocese of Salina. It is the second cathedral for the diocese after Our Lady of Perpetual Help in Concordia, Kansas when the See was located there.

History
The Diocese of Concordia was established by Pope Leo XIII on August 2, 1887. On December 23, 1944, Pope Pius XII transferred the See to Salina and Sacred Heart Church became the new cathedral.  Edward J. Schulte of Cincinnati was chosen as the architect for a new cathedral church. The cornerstone was laid on June 4, 1951, and it was dedicated by Bishop Francis Thill on June 6, 1953. A renovation project in 1998 altered the interior and an enlarged gathering space and parish hall were added in 2000.

Architecture
Sacred Heart Cathedral’s architecture references the rural character of Northwestern Kansas and relates it to the Eucharistic aspects of the Catholic Church. Concrete grain elevators dot the landscape and contain the area’s primary crop, wheat. The sides of the exterior of the cathedral are rounded and mimic the grain elevators and symbolize the Church as God’s granary from which people are nourished by the Eucharist. The cathedral’s bell tower is also round and reflects the shape of a farm silo. As farm animals gather to be nourished at the silo, so people gather within the church building for their spiritual nourishment from Christ, the Good Shepherd. The main entrance into the cathedral features a procession of the faithful in a bas relief. The figures represent a farm family, priests and religious who assist the bishop in carrying the cross. A Capuchin friar kneels before the cross in adoration. The panel carries a quote from the Bible, "He who does not take up his cross and follow me is not worthy of me."

The interior features a large baptismal font in the shape of the cross in the gathering space. Nearby is a triptych containing icons of the cathedral’s patron the Sacred Heart of Jesus, and the diocese’s primary patron Our Lady of Perpetual Help and St. Francis of Assisi, who is its secondary patron. The nave of the cathedral is lined with pillars that are  around. At the base of the bell tower is a room that was formerly used as a baptistery. It now contains a shrine to Our Lady of Guadalupe. The statue in the chapel was from a small parish that closed in 1965. A bas relief of the Sacred Heart is featured on the back wall of the cathedral with a Latin phrase on its base, Cor Jesu, inflama cor nostrum amore tui (Heart of Jesus, inflame our hearts with your love). Twelve crosses with candles line the walls represent the Twelve Apostles and are where the walls were consecrated with Sacred Chrism when the cathedral was consecrated. The fourteen Stations of the Cross are etched into the east wall.

The circular canopy around the crucifix contains three Latin phrases: Cor Jesu, spes in te morientium (Heart of Jesus, hope of those who die in you); Domus Dei et porta coeli (House of God and gate of heaven); and Cor Jesu, omni laude dignissimum, salve in te sperantium (Heart of Jesus, most worthy of all praise, salvation of those who hope in you). The marble legs of the Altar were taken from the former communion rail and it contains the relics of St. Boniface and St. Clement. The Blessed Sacrament is housed in the chapel of the Blessed Virgin Mary.

The stained glass windows in the cathedral were designed by Anton Wendling from Aachen, Germany, and were assembled by Erhardt Stettner in Milwaukee, Wisconsin. There are five smaller windows above the confessionals that cost $1,000 each.

Pipe organ
The organ was originally built by George Kilgen and Son (Opus 3655) in 1926 in the previous Sacred Heart Church.  It was rebuilt here when the cathedral was under construction in 1952.  A new III Plein Jeu and an 8' Gemshorn were added at that time, as was a new three-manual console.  However, the original two-manual console was still used for a time.  The organ was rebuilt and altered by Larson Organ Co. of Marquette, Kansas in 1987. The original pipework was removed and placed into storage. Coombs Organ Specialists restored the organ in 2003 to its original specs with the original pipework. At the same time, they added a new three-manual Rodgers console with digital additions.

The pipe organ is located in the front of the cathedral near the altar.  The pipes are located in a chamber on the side wall. There are no exposed pipes. It features a traditional style console in a fixed position with a roll top. It is equipped with electro-pneumatic (EP) chests. There are three manuals, 15 registers, and 17 ranks. The manual compass is 61 notes and the pedal compass is 32 notes. The stop keys are located above the top manual. It features balanced swell shoes/pedals with standard AGO placement, adjustable combination pistons, AGO Standard (concave radiating) pedalboard, crescendo pedal, reversible full organ/tutti thumb piston, reversible full organ/tutti toe stud, combination action thumb pistons, combination action toe studs, and coupler reversible thumb pistons.

Stoplist:

Great
8' Diapason       61               
8' Flauto Primo   61                
8' Gemshorn       61 (New)          
4' Principal      12                
4' Gemshorn       12                
2-2/3' Quint                            
 2' Super Octave

Swell
16' Bourdon        97
8' Diapason        73
8 Gedackt
8' Viole de Gamba   73
8' Viole Celeste    49
8' Aeoline          73
4' Flute D' Amour 
2-2/3' Nazard
2' Flautino
III Plein Jeu     183 (new)
8' Cornopean       73
8' Vox Humana      73
8' Oboe (Prep)
Tremolo

Choir
8' Viola         73             
8' Melodia       61             
8' Dulciana      61             
8' Unda Maris   (Prep)           
4' Flute         12              
4' Dulcet        12              
2-2/3' Dolce Nazard                  
2' Piccolo       12              
1-3/5' Dolce Tierce                  
8' Clarinet (Prep)   

Pedal
16' Diapason         12
16' Bourdon          32
16' Lieblich Gedeckt Swell
8' Diapason          Great
8' Gedeckt           Swell
8' Gemshorn          Great
4' Principal         Great
4' Block Floete      Choir
8' Cornopean         Swell

See also
List of Catholic cathedrals in the United States
List of cathedrals in the United States

References

External links
Official Cathedral Site
Roman Catholic Diocese of Salina Official Site

Roman Catholic cathedrals in Kansas
Roman Catholic churches completed in 1953
Churches in the Roman Catholic Diocese of Salina
Salina, Kansas
Modernist architecture in Kansas
20th-century Roman Catholic church buildings in the United States